The president of the Socialist Republic of Vietnam is the head of state of Vietnam, elected by the Vietnam National Assembly from delegates of the National Assembly. Since Vietnam is a single-party state, the president is generally considered to hold the second highest position  in the political system, formally after the General Secretary of the Communist Party of Vietnam. In addition, the president appoints the head of government, the Prime Minister. As head of state, the President represents Vietnam both domestically and internationally, and maintains the regular and coordinated operation and stability of the national government and safeguards the independence and territorial integrity of the country. 

The president must be a delegate of the National Assembly and is traditionally a member of the Central Committee of the Communist Party. The Central Committee of the Communist Party nominates candidates to the Standing Committee of the National Assembly, the Standing Committee of the National Assembly then confirms and nominates those candidates for official election by all delegates of the National Assembly. 

The president appoints the vice president, prime minister, ministers, and other officials with the consent of the National Assembly. The president is furthermore the supreme commander-in-chief of the Vietnam People's Armed Forces, chairman of the Council for Defense and Security. Moreover, member of Political Bureau, standing member of the Central Military Commission and the Central Police Party Committee. Since September 2011, the president is also the head of the Central Steering Committee for Judicial Reform. The tenure of the president is five years, and a president can only serve three terms. If the president becomes unable to discharge duties of office, the vice president assumes the office of acting president until the president resumes duty, or until the election of a new president.

The powers and prestige of the office of president have varied over the years. For instance, while the inaugural president, Hồ Chí Minh, was also the chairman of the Communist Party, making him (in that capacity) the first ranking member of the Politburo, the highest decision-making body in Vietnam, his successor, Tôn Đức Thắng, served as a symbolic figure along with General Secretary Lê Duẩn. Since Trường Chinh's ascension to the presidency, the president has been ranked 1st (he was sometimes also chairman of the party) or 2nd in the order of precedence of the Communist Party's Politburo except President Nguyễn Minh Triết ranked fourth and President Võ Chí Công ranked third. Three persons served concurrently as head of both the party and state: Hồ Chí Minh (1951–1969), Trường Chinh (1986) and Nguyễn Phú Trọng (2018–2021).

Võ Văn Thưởng is the current President of Vietnam after being appointed by the National Assembly on 2 March 2023. He is the youngest person to hold this position since the republic's founding in 1945.

History 

Hồ Chí Minh was appointed Vietnam's first president in 1946 by the National Assembly. The 1959 Constitutions stated that the National Assembly had the power to appoint and dismiss the president. The president represented Vietnam both internally and externally. The power and responsibilities of the president in 1946 constitution is very similar to the power and responsibilities of the president of the United States with elements from the president of France being both the head of state and the head of government.The 1959 constitution significantly reduced the power of the president, making the president the de jure leader of Vietnam while handling most of the de facto power to the post of General Secretary of the Central Committee of the Communist Party of Vietnam. The 1980 constitution transformed the office of head of state dramatically. The office of president was abolished and replaced with the office of Chairman of the Council of State (CC). The CC chairmanship was modelled after the Soviet office of Chairman of the Presidium of the Supreme Soviet. The Council of State, as with the Council of Ministers, was a collective decision-making body. Both the Council of State and the Council of Ministers were part of the executive branch; the strengthening of these institutions weakened the role of the legislative branch. The duties, powers and responsibilities of the Council of State were taken from the Standing Committee of the National Assembly, which lost most of its powers and prestige in the 1980 Constitution.

The members of the Council of State were elected by the National Assembly and consisted of a chairman, deputy chairmen, a general secretary and other members. Council of State members could not concurrently be members of the Council of Ministers. The chairman of the Council of State was concurrently chairman of the National Defense Council (later the National Defense and Security Council) and commander-in-chief of the Vietnam People's Armed Forces. The Council of State supervised the works of other institutions, most notably the Council of Ministers, the Supreme People's Organ for Control and the People's Councils at all levels. It also presided over the elections of the National Assembly. The office of Chairman of the Council of State, the head of state, was abolished in the 1992 Constitution and replaced by the office of President.

The importance of the president has not remained constant throughout Vietnamese history. For instance, while Hồ Chí Minh was ranked as first member of the Politburo, the highest decision-making body in Vietnam, his successor, Tôn Đức Thắng, was a symbolic figure with little power. The post of head of state was strengthened in the 1980 Constitution by the appointment of Trường Chinh who was, by order of precedence, the second-highest-ranking member in the Politburo, behind Lê Duẩn. The office of president retained the second highest rank in the Politburo order of precedence until Nguyễn Minh Triết was appointed in 2006; he ranked fourth in the Politburo hierarchy. The Politburo elected in the aftermath of the 11th National Party Congress (held in January 2011) by the Central Committee elected Trương Tấn Sang, the current president, the first-ranking member of the Politburo. This was the first time in Vietnamese history where the highest-ranking member of the Politburo does not hold post of either general secretary or chairman (was in existence from 1951 to 1969) of the party. Since Trương Tấn Sang is first-ranked member of the Politburo, he is the body's unofficial head. Politburo meetings are held regularly; decisions within the Politburo are made through collective decision-making, and policies are only enacted if a majority of Politburo members supports them.

Term of office

The president is selected for a term of office of five years. The term of office of the incumbent president continues until the president-elect takes office

On assuming office, the president takes the following oath before the parliament:

Duties, powers and responsibilities

The president is the head of state of Vietnam, and his main priority is to represent Vietnam internally and externally. The officeholder is elected by the National Assembly of Vietnam, is responsible to it and reports to it. The tenure of the president is five years, the same as that of the National Assembly. The president continues to serve in his functions until the National Assembly elects a successor. The president has the following executive and legislative powers:
 To promulgate laws, decree-laws and the Constitution,
 To suspend the implementation or abrogation of the documents of the prime minister or the deputy prime minister which contravene the Constitution and the Laws
 To act as the country's commander-in-chief and holds the office of Chairman of the National Defense and Security Council of Vietnam,
 To convene meetings of the National Defense and Security Council of Vietnam,
 The president shall take measures to protect the sovereignty of the Socialist Republic of Vietnam its independence and state integrity, and ensure concerted functioning and interaction of all bodies of state power,
 To propose to the National Assembly the election or dismissal from office of the vice president, the prime minister, the Chief justice of the Supreme People's Court and the head of the Supreme People's Office of Supervision and Control,
 The president has the right to preside over meetings of the Government of Vietnam,
 To appoint or dismiss officials, staff and employees of the Office of the President,
 To appoint or dismiss deputy prime ministers, ministers and other members of the government,
 To proclaim a state of war or amnesty,
 On the basis of a Standing Committee resolution, the president can order a general or partial mobilisation, or can proclaim a state of emergency nationwide or in a particular region,
 To propose that the Standing Committee review its decree-laws and resolutions on matters stipulated in Points 8 and 9, Article 91, within the space of ten days following their adoption; if those decree-laws and resolutions are again passed by the Standing Committee of the National Assembly with the country's president dissenting, the latter shall report the matter to the National Assembly for it to decide the issue at its nearest session,
 To appoint or dismiss the deputy Chief justice and judges of the Supreme People's Court and the Deputy Director of the Supreme People's Office of Supervision and Control,
  To appoint or dismiss the chief of general staff, vice chief of general staff, chief of the General Department of Politics and the vice chief of the General Political Department
 To confer titles and ranks on senior officers of the Vietnam People's Armed Forces and bestows "diplomatic titles and ranks, and other State titles and ranks; to confer medals, badges and State honours and distinctions",
 To appoint and recall ambassadors extraordinary and plenipotentiary, and receive foreign ambassadors extraordinary and plenipotentiary, to negotiate and sign international agreements on behalf of the Socialist Republic with the heads of other states; he can approve or join international agreements, except in cases where a decision by the National Assembly is necessary,
 To grant Vietnamese nationality, release from Vietnamese nationality, or deprive of Vietnamese nationality,
 To hold Head of Steering Committee of the Central Judicial Reform,
 To supervise the detection and handles all corrupt behaviors,
 To hold Director of the Economic Council.

The National Defense and Security Council (NDSC) is composed of the president, the prime minister and other members. The members of the NDSC are proposed by the president and approved by the National Assembly. NDSC members do not need to be members of the National Assembly. The decision-making process of the NDSC is that of a collective leadership. Among its powers is the right to mobilise all forces in the name of national defense, and in case of war the National Assembly can entrust the NDSC with special duties and powers.

Succession
According to Article 93 of the Constitution of Vietnam (2013):

"When the President is incapacitated from work over a long period of time, the Vice President shall succeed as acting President. In case of vacancy of the Presidency, the Vice President shall serve as acting President until a new President is elected by the National Assembly."

See also
 List of presidents of Vietnam
 Vice President of Vietnam
 Prime Minister of Vietnam
 Deputy Prime Minister of Vietnam
 Council for National Defense and Security (Vietnam)
 General Secretary of the Communist Party of Vietnam
 List of central officeholders in the Communist Party of Vietnam
 Air transports of heads of state and government

References

Notes

Citations

Works cited 

 
 

Government of Vietnam
Politics of Vietnam
1945 establishments in Vietnam